Tot Pond is the smaller and western of two closely spaced frozen ponds in the floor of Alatna Valley, filled by overflow from the larger adjacent Rum Pond, in the Convoy Range, Victoria Land. Named by a 1989-90 New Zealand Antarctic Research Program (NZARP) field party (Trevor Chinn) in association with Rum Pond; in nautical circles a tot is a traditional small issue of rum.

Lakes of Victoria Land
Scott Coast